Sergi Enrique Montserrat (born 22 September 1987) is a Spanish field hockey player who plays as a defender for Atlètic Terrassa and the Spain national team.

Club career
Enrique has played for Atletic Terrassa and Junior in Spain and Royal Daring in Belgium. He returned to Atlètic Terrassa for the 2019–20 season.

International career
He played internationally with the Spain national team that won the silver medal at the 2008 Summer Olympics in Beijing, PR China. During the 2019 EuroHockey Championship, where they won the silver medal, he became Spain's most capped player of all time with 305 appearances for the national team.

References

External links
 

1987 births
Living people
Spanish male field hockey players
Male field hockey defenders
Olympic field hockey players of Spain
2006 Men's Hockey World Cup players
Field hockey players at the 2008 Summer Olympics
2010 Men's Hockey World Cup players
Field hockey players at the 2012 Summer Olympics
2014 Men's Hockey World Cup players
Field hockey players at the 2016 Summer Olympics
2018 Men's Hockey World Cup players
People from Vallès Occidental
Sportspeople from the Province of Barcelona
Medalists at the 2008 Summer Olympics
Olympic silver medalists for Spain
Olympic medalists in field hockey
Hockey India League players
Atlètic Terrassa players
División de Honor de Hockey Hierba players
Men's Belgian Hockey League players
Royal Daring players